Reflection is the second album by London-based electronic musician Loraine James, released through Hyperdub in June 2021, which has been met with critical acclaim. It follows James' 2020 Nothing EP.

Composition
While Reflection is mostly an exploration of "heartfelt" electronica, it also quotes elements from drill music, R&B, techno, and more.

Critical reception

Reflection has received positive reviews. On Metacritic, it holds a score of 86 out of 100, indicating "universal acclaim", based on nine reviews.

Tom Morgan for PopMatters lauded the record as "a work of seductive, heartfelt brilliance", noting that James is "at the absolute peak of her powers." He gave the album a 10 out of 10 rating.

Stephen Worthy of Mojo described the album's tracks as James' "genre-bending confessionals that balance truth with hope." He added that as an "endlessly inventive album," Reflections "sets a noteworthy template for modern British electronic music", notably for being "a succession of counterpoints."

And while AllMusic noted that "Reflection doesn't quite have the shock of the new that For You and I did," the online database admitted that "its best moments are still powerful" and that "it would be impossible to mistake the album for anyone else's perspective."

Track listing

Accolades

References

2021 albums
Electronic albums by English artists
Hyperdub albums